Marek Michalak (born 27 July 1971 in Świdnica) is a Polish pedagogue and social activist. Since 2007, he has been the Chancellor of the Chapter of the Order of the Smile and from 2008 to 2018 the Polish Commissioner for Children's Rights.

References 

Ombudsmen in Poland
Children's Ombudsmen
Living people
1971 births